Wine & Spirits is an American wine magazine. With an editorial and business office in New York, the magazine publishes four issues annually.

History and profile
The magazine was started under the name Winestate's Wine & Spirits Buying Guide. In October 1984 it changed to Wine & Spirits. Joshua Greene acquired Wine & Spirits in 1989. In addition to publisher and editor-in-chief Joshua Greene, the editorial staff includes Patrick Comiskey, Stephanie Johnson, Corey Warren, Susannah Smith and Alissa Bica. Nick Mrozowski is the creative director. Contributors include Patricio Tapia, David Darlington, Elaine Chukan Brown, Chantal Martineau, David Schildknecht, Fiona Morrison MW and Tyler Colman.

While the magazine has been rating wine on a 100-point scale since 1994, Joshua Greene is an outspoken critic of the system.

See also
 List of food and drink magazines

References

External links
 Wine & Spirits official site

Eight times annually magazines published in the United States
Lifestyle magazines published in the United States
Magazines established in 1981
Magazines published in the San Francisco Bay Area
Wine magazines